Herman Johan Foss Reimers (15 September 1843 – 7 February 1928) was Norwegian judge and politician for the Conservative Party.

Background
Reimers was born at Bergen in Hordaland, Norway. He was cand. jur. in 1867.

Career
He served in the Ministry of Finance during 1878. From April to June 1884 he was Councillor of State and  Chief of the Norwegian Minister of Finance as a part of the short-lived Schweigaard's Ministerium in the cabinet of Prime Minister Christian Homann Schweigaard. . From 1884 he was a Supreme Court Assessor.

He was a member of Kristiania (now Oslo) city council from 1887 to 1892, and he served the term 1889–1891 as a member of the Parliament of Norway, representing the constituency of Østerrisør.

Personal life
His granddaughter Mimi Reimers married Olaf D. Thommessen.

References

1843 births
1928 deaths
Norwegian judges
Members of the Storting
Ministers of Finance of Norway
Politicians from Oslo
Aust-Agder politicians
Conservative Party (Norway) politicians
19th-century Norwegian politicians